Chetek is a city in Barron County, Wisconsin, United States. The population was 2,221 at the 2010 census. The city is located partially within the Town of Chetek.

History
The original inhabitants of the area were the Ojibwa Indians, who referred to the area as zhedeg, meaning pelicans. This was translated into various spellings, such as Sheetak, Shetak, Shetuk, Chetack, until the first post office was opened in 1872. The spelling was then standardized to "Chetek."

In 1872, the Omaha Railroad began service to Chetek, the Knapp-Stout logging camp was established, and the first log schoolhouse was built.

Other important dates:
 1881 – Medical care became available
 1882 – The Chetek Alert began publication, a newspaper still serving the area
 1891 – Became a city
 1903 – Telephone service was introduced
 1904 – Fire Department began
 1960 – Roselawn Elementary opened
 2010 – School District of Chetek consolidates with Weyerhaeuser School District
 2017 – EF3 tornado swept through the town, killing one and injuring 25, as well as damaging and destroying structures.

Geography
Chetek is located at  (45.318656, -91.65447).

Chetek is along U.S. Highway 53, as well as County Roads I and SS.

Demographics

2010 census
As of the census of 2010, there were 2,221 people, 951 households, and 564 families living in the city. The racial makeup of the city was 97.4% White, 0.2% African American, 0.4% Native American, 0.3% Asian, 0.7% from other races, and 0.9% from two or more races. Hispanic or Latino of any race were 1.8% of the population.

There were 951 households, of which 26.9% had children under the age of 18 living with them, 43.2% were married couples living together, 11.3% had a female householder with no husband present, 4.8% had a male householder with no wife present, and 40.7% were non-families. 34.8% of all households were made up of individuals, and 18.4% had someone living alone who was 65 years of age or older. The average household size was 2.22 and the average family size was 2.82.

The median age in the city was 44.7 years. 21.1% of residents were under the age of 18; 6.8% were between the ages of 18 and 24; 22.6% were from 25 to 44; 24.7% were from 45 to 64; and 25% were 65 years of age or older. The gender makeup of the city was 45.9% male and 54.1% female.

2000 census
As of the census of 2000, there were 2,180 people, 939 households, and 568 families living in the city. The population density was 925.7 people per square mile (358.2/km2). There were 1,052 housing units at an average density of 446.7 per square mile (172.8/km2). The racial makeup of the city was 98.62% White, 0.09% Black or African American, 0.32% Native American, 0.23% Asian, 0.05% Pacific Islander, 0.09% from other races, and 0.60% from two or more races. Hispanic or Latino of any race were 0.96% of the population.

There were 939 households, out of which 25.0% had children under the age of 18 living with them, 47.9% were married couples living together, 8.7% had a female householder with no husband present, and 39.5% were non-families. 34.9% of all households were made up of individuals, and 20.4% had someone living alone who was 65 years of age or older. The average household size was 2.21 and the average family size was 2.81.

In the city, the population was spread out, with 22.2% under the age of 18, 7.2% from 18 to 24, 24.3% from 25 to 44, 20.8% from 45 to 64, and 25.6% who were 65 years of age or older. The median age was 43 years. For every 100 females, there were 92.9 males. For every 100 females age 18 and over, there were 88.6 males.

The median income for a household in the city was $31,270, and the median income for a family was $40,114. Males had a median income of $28,375 versus $18,906 for females. The per capita income for the city was $17,922. About 9.0% of families and 12.4% of the population were below the poverty line, including 15.0% of those under age 18 and 8.3% of those age 65 or over.

Transportation
Chetek Municipal–Southworth Airport (Y23) serves the city and surrounding communities.

Notable people
 Leona E. Tyler, American psychologist and President of the American Psychological Association
 J. B. Van Hollen, Wisconsin Attorney General
 John C. Van Hollen, Wisconsin realtor and politician

See also
 List of cities in Wisconsin

References

External links

 
 Chetek Chamber of Commerce
 Chetek - Weyerhaeuser Area School District

Cities in Wisconsin
Cities in Barron County, Wisconsin